Penicillium lineatum is a species of the genus of Penicillium.

References

Further reading

 
 

lineatum
Fungi described in 1980